Arif Aziz Sheikh is a Pakistani politician who had been a member of the National Assembly of Pakistan from 2008 to 2013.

Political career 
He was elected to the National Assembly of Pakistan from Constituency NA-183 (Bahawalpur-I) as a candidate of Pakistan Peoples Party (PPP) in 2008 Pakistani general election. He received 71,394 votes and defeated Syed Sami-ul-Hassan Gilani, a candidate of Pakistan Muslim League (Q) (PML-Q).

He ran for the seat of the National Assembly as a candidate for PPP from Constituency NA-183 (Bahawalpur-I) in 2013 Pakistani general election, but was unsuccessful. He received 61,891 votes and lost the seat to Syed Ali Hassan Gilani.

References

Living people
Pakistan People's Party politicians
People from Bahawalpur District
Pakistani MNAs 2008–2013
Year of birth missing (living people)